The  is a rest area that is located on the Fukagawa Route of the Shuto Expressway in Tatsumi, Kōtō, Tokyo.

Located in the Tatsumi Junction, only vehicles heading from the Bayshore Route via Ariake Junction to the Fukagawa Route (Hakozaki area) can be used.

It is a place where car enthusiasts gather because it is a large parking area for the Shuto Expressway in the 23 wards, and the night view of skyscrapers and the pictures of their cars "shine". On the other hand, annoying acts such as long-term occupation, noise, and sudden acceleration called "Tatsumi Dash" have become problems. Fences that block the night view and speed bumps that make it difficult for illegally modified vehicles to enter and exit were installed.

References

External links
 Tatsumi No. 1 PA - Tatsumi No. 1 PA-Metropolitan Expressway Service 

Rest areas in Japan
Road transport in Tokyo
Kōtō